Adailton de Jesus (born August 9, 1978) is a Brazilian boxer in the Featherweight division. He was born in Salvador, Bahia.

Professional career
Known as "Precipício", Adailton turned pro in 2002 in his hometown. Adailton's trainer is Servílio de Oliveira, who won a bronze medal at the 1968 Summer Olympics in Mexico City.

After four years fighting in Brazil he made his USA debut against Kevin Carmody, he won a majority decision. Since that fight Adailton is making a spectacular career in the USA.

In October 30, 2007, he fought Yuriorkis Gamboa and lost by technical knockout. In his last fight, he lost a controversial Unanimous Decision against Mexican-American Marcos Ramirez for the Vacant IBF Latino Featherweight Title. The fight was held in Kansas City, the hometown of Marcos Ramirez.ESPN announcer Teddy Atlas scored Adailton De Jesus as a two-point winner. Upon hearing the scoring of the judges, Atlas remarked that "... De Jesus should have never even gotten on the plane."

References

External links
 

1978 births
Living people
Featherweight boxers
Brazilian male boxers
Sportspeople from Salvador, Bahia